Bryan Allan Davis (born 2 May 1940) is a former West Indian international cricketer who played in four Test matches in 1965. He later qualified for Glamorgan, playing in the championship winning side in 1969.

1940 births
Living people
Trinidad and Tobago expatriates in the United Kingdom
Glamorgan cricketers
International Cavaliers cricketers
North Trinidad cricketers
Trinidad and Tobago cricketers
West Indies Test cricketers